The Podium is a mixed-use development located along ADB Avenue in the Ortigas Center, a major business and commercial district in Mandaluyong, Philippines. It was developed in December 2001 and officially opened in August 2002 as a joint project of Singaporean company, Keppel Land, and BDO Unibank. 

The buildings are the BDO Corporate Center and The Podium West Tower which were built in 2015 and 2019. 

A six-level expansion (Phase 2), located beside the main mall, was opened on October 27, 2017. The expansion will also include a podium within the towers, and was opened on 2019. The main building (Phase 1) entered renovation works following the opening, and was completed in December 2018.

Features
Designed with a modern mix of glass, curves and green. The Podium features intricate architectural accents and a living green wall facade.
It also features three Director's Club Cinemas that were opened on December 15, 2018.

References

External links
The Podium Official Website

Shopping malls in Mandaluyong
Shopping malls established in 2002
Ortigas Center
2002 establishments in the Philippines